The qualification round of  Men's 50 metre rifle three positions event at 2014 Commonwealth Games will start  at morning of  29 July 2014 at the Barry Buddon Shooting Centre, while the final will be held in the evening   at the same place.

Results

Qualification

Finals

References

External links
Schedule

Shooting at the 2014 Commonwealth Games